Trisha Romance  is an American-born Canadian painter and illustrator of popular realistic and idyllic subjects.

Works
Romance's work commonly features domestic settings, family events, and holiday scenes. Often depicted are "ideal[s] in family life", reminiscent of artists in the American Scene Painting tradition. 
She made her public debut with her work "Speaking of Spring" in 1978.

In addition to her paintings, Romance is a published author. The World of Trisha Romance, an oversize book containing works by Romance, was published by Studio, a Penguin imprint, in 1992. It contains 130 full-color reproductions of Romance's paintings, many of which had never been published before. She is also the author of A Star for Christmas, a children's book published in 2007 by Tundra Press.
Many of Romance's works are available as reproduction prints using the giclée process, as well as on posters and collectible plates.

Romance Inn project
In 2010, Romance proposed creating the Romance Inn on the grounds of the former Randwood estate in Niagara-on-the-Lake, which would consist of a 100-room lodging facility and restaurant, as well as a cultural centre with studio space available where "guests may explore their creative talents and be inspired by their own creations". The proposal met with some opposition from local residents, and evenly divided the town council — the proposal only received approval when the mayor cast the deciding vote in favour.

Awards, honors, and media appearances
Romance is a member of the Order of Ontario (since 1996), the province's most prestigious official honor. She also is a winner of the Canadian Artist of the Year Award in 1995, 1996, 1997, and 1998. 
She carried the Olympic Torch through Niagara-on-the-Lake during the relay leading up to the 2010 Winter Olympics in Vancouver, British Columbia.
Romance has been featured on Fred Anderton's "You Asked" series on CHCH News, on 100 Huntley Street's Full Circle, and on 'Person 2 Person with Paula Todd', a TV Ontario interview program.
The print of her work "The Bakery" won the 2002 Collectible of the Year Award from Collectibles Canada.

Personal life 
Romance was born in Hamburg, New York in 1951.
She moved to Canada in 1969 to attend Sheridan College in Oakville, Ontario, where she received a degree in design and illustration. 
Along with her children and her husband, Gary Peterson, who is also her manager and promoter. Romance lives in Niagara-On-The-Lake in Southern Ontario, Canada, where she also maintains a gallery of her works.

References

External links

TrishaRomance.com
The Romance Collection
The Romance Inn

1951 births
Living people
American emigrants to Canada
Canadian landscape painters
20th-century Canadian painters
21st-century Canadian painters
Canadian children's book illustrators
Members of the Order of Ontario
Artists from New York (state)
Sheridan College alumni